Poshteh-ye Yek (also known as Poshteh) is a village in Gughar Rural District, in the Central District of Baft County, Kerman Province, Iran. At the 2006 census, its population was 36, in 8 families.

References 

Populated places in Baft County